Brian Malfesi (born October 3, 1993) is a Canadian sprint kayaker.

Career
At the 2019 ICF Canoe Sprint World Championships  Malfesi and partner Vincent Jourdenais finished in 14th place in the K-2 1000 metres.

In May 2021, Malfesi was named to Canada's 2020 Olympic team.

References

1993 births
Canadian male canoeists
Living people
People from Maple Ridge, British Columbia
Canoeists at the 2020 Summer Olympics
Olympic canoeists of Canada